Jackson Pollock: An American Saga is a 1989 biography of abstract expressionist painter Jackson Pollock, by Steven Naifeh and Gregory White Smith. It was awarded the 1991 Pulitzer Prize for Biography or Autobiography.

Reception
It was considered "well-researched" by Publishers Weekly and Library Journal. The book's reception inspired Ed Harris to adapt it to film as Pollock in 2000. Marcia Gay Harden received the Academy Award for Best Supporting Actress for the role of Lee Krasner.

In the New York Times Book Review, author and critic Elizabeth Frank said the work was especially strong on Krasner: "The Pollock-Krasner relationship becomes the center of the book, as indeed it should in any biography of Pollock, and to a certain extent the book even becomes Krasner's story more than Pollack's."

Composition
The book was the first to explore the artist with psychological depth, based on interviews with over 850 people. The authors researched for eight years, had insight into various unpublished documents, medical and psychiatric reports, conversations with the artist's friends and widow Lee Krasner.

See Also
 Pollock (film)

First edition
C. N. Potter, 1989,

References

External links
New York Times Book Review on Jackson Pollock: An American Saga

1989 non-fiction books
American biographies
Biographies adapted into films
Jackson Pollock
Collaborative non-fiction books
Pulitzer Prize for Biography or Autobiography-winning works